Elise Vogel Polko (31 January 1823 in Leipzig – 15 May 1899 in Munich) was a German novelist.

Biography
She was a sister of Eduard Vogel, the African explorer, and attained considerable fame as a public singer, but retired from the stage after her marriage to Polko, a scientist, and thenceforth devoted herself to literature, in which field she won much notice.

Works
Her Musikalische Märchen (Musical tales; 1852) was translated into English, as were others of her books. She published Ein Frauenleben (A woman's life; 1854), Erinnerungen an Felix Mendelssohn Bartholdy (Recollections of Felix Mendelssohn; 1868), Aus dem Jahre 1870, Conversations (1872), Neues Märchenbuch (1884), and other works.

Notes

References

External links
 
 

1822 births
1899 deaths
19th-century German women singers
German women novelists
19th-century German novelists
19th-century German women writers